The 2023 FIBA Intercontinental Cup was the 32nd edition of the FIBA Intercontinental Cup. The tournament was held on 10 and 12 February 2023 in San Cristóbal de La Laguna, on the Spanish island of Tenerife. It was the third time that the tournament is held in Tenerife after 2017 and 2020.

Canarias (known as Lenovo Tenerife for sponsorship reasons) won its third Intercontinental Cup title after defeating São Paulo in the final. Bruno Fitipaldo was named the MVP. Rio Grande Valley Vipers came in third place, US Monastir in the fourth.

Teams
On December 6, 2021, FIBA announced the champions of the 2022 FIBA Asia Champions Cup would be added to the competition. The tournament was to be expanded from four to at least five teams. It would be the first time an Asian club participated since 1985. However, the Asia Champions Cup was cancelled due to the COVID-19 pandemic, and no team participated.

Venue

Draw 
The draw for the semi-final pairings was held on 13 January 2023 in the building of the Cabildo Insular de Tenerife, the governing body of Tenerife.

Results

Bracket

Semi-finals

Third place game

Final

References

External links
 Official website
 FIBA official website

2023
2023 in basketball
2022–23 in Spanish basketball
February 2023 sports events in Spain
International basketball competitions hosted by Spain
Sport in Tenerife